1977 Soviet Second League was a Soviet competition in the Soviet Second League.

Qualifying groups

Group I [Northwest and Central]

Group II [Ukraine]

Group III [Volga–Russian South]

Group IV [Caucasus and Ural]

Group V [Central Asia and West Siberia]

Group VI (Kazakhstan and East Siberia)

Promotion playoffs
 [Oct 31, Nov 5]
 Spartak Semipalatinsk  2-2 0-3  SKA Odessa 
 Kuban Krasnodar        2-0 1-2  Yangiyer 
 Spartak Nalchik        1-0 0-1  Žalgiris Vilnius

Additional finals 
 [Nov 8]
 KUBAN Krasnodar        2-0  Yangiyer         [in Simferopol] 
 ŽALGIRIS Vilnius       2-1  Spartak Nalchik  [in Kishinev]

References
 All-Soviet Archive Site
 Results. RSSSF

Soviet Second League seasons
3
Soviet
Soviet